Haynes Roadster is a replica of a Lotus Seven home-built according to a book Build Your Own Sports Car: On a Budget by Chris Gibbs. A Ford Sierra is used in the car as a donor for drivetrain and suspension components.

The Haynes Roadster is a follow-up to the Locost design described in a book by Ron Champion.  Locost uses Ford Escort Mark II as a donor, but as these have become increasingly rare, a design based on a more affordable Ford Sierra has been proposed.  In contrast to Locost, which used Escort's solid axle at the rear, Haynes Roadster has independent, double wishbone, front and rear suspension.

Technical details 
The main part of the car is a space frame chassis, which can be home-built according to the drawings and instructions in the book from rectangular 25x25 mm and 19x19 mm mild steel tubes.  Several suppliers offer pre-built chassis.  Flat pack kits, or sets of tubes cut to size and ready for assembly, are also available.  Since the cars are hand built, and often the book design is modified to some extent, each chassis is unique, but as a rough guide, it weighs around 700 kg when completed.

The suspension wishbones are fabricated out of cold-drawn seamless mild steel tubes.  Sierra front uprights are used with some modification.  At the rear fabricated uprights support Sierra rear hubs. Coilover dampers used for the design are available at specialist suppliers.

The drivetrain usually consists of a Ford Pinto, CVH, or Zetec engine mated to a Sierra gearbox, a shortened or custom-made propeller shaft, Sierra differential, and driveshafts.
The book design is based on the Type 9 gearbox, but the list of chassis modifications in order to fit the bigger MT75 transmission is provided on the Haynes forum.

The braking system is taken directly from Ford Sierra, with the exception of vacuum servo, which is not required for the lightweight car.

The steering system is usually composed out of a lengthened Ford Sierra steering column and a Ford Escort MkII steering rack.

The bodywork is a combination of GRP parts and sheet aluminum panels.

Alternate donors can be used by adapting the design of the front and rear suspension, a common alternative is the BMW E30/E36(an increasingly utilised kitcar donor as in the GKD Legend) and the Mazda MX5. Other manufacturers engine and gearbox's are also popular such as the Vauxhall XE. The modern prevalence of Front-wheel drive layout makes the choice of suitable engine/gearbox donors quite limited.

As the supply of Ford Sierra donors in the UK is waning, the use of Mazda MX-5 is becoming more widespread, with the modifications to the chassis and suspension necessary in order to accept MX-5 components being independently published by the members of the community.

Community 
There is a community of builders, as well as parts and services suppliers, based around a forum focused on the Roadster.  The forum is set up and operated by Haynes, the publishers of the book describing the design.  The community is mostly UK-based, but there are builders all around the world.
There are 27 completed cars known to the forum members as of aug 2013.

Legal Rules

UK 
In the UK, Self builds are subject to a stringent test. The now defunct SVA (Single Vehicle Approval) was replaced in April 2009 with the IVA (Individual Vehicle Assessment) which costs £450 and is carried out by one of a number of VOSA testing stations throughout the UK. It is legal to drive to and from the IVA so long as the car is insured. Once the car has passed the IVA it must be inspected by the DVLA (once DVLC) local office for the purpose of registration. The car is categorised as new built which by law a MOT test is not required until it has aged to three years, the same standard as are all new built retail cars).

The DVLA will issue an age related number plate if a substantial portion of components were from the same donor car (proof needed).
The DVLA will issue a NEW car plate if the car is built from all new (1 part can be re-manufactured) components.
The DVLA will issue a Q Plate if the parts are from many cars or an undetermined donor car.

Sweden 
Technically, kit cars are not allowed in Sweden, but provided that most of the components and material are sourced by the builder personally it is possible to register them as amateur built vehicles. The inspection (SVA equivalent) in Sweden is handled by the car builder's association SFRO who makes two inspections; one when the car has reached the rolling chassis stage and the second when the car is finished. Converting the MacPherson strut of the Ford Sierra to a double wishbone is not allowed as it is not designed for it.

Motorsport 
By 2014 2 completed road-legal Haynes Roadsters have been used in the UK in amateur Motorsport Events run by the MSA at clubman level at tarmac sprints and hillclimbs. Just like the Locost car the Haynes Roadster fits in the MSA's "specialist production car class" as identical chassis are or have been commercially available to the public in quantities over 20 made in a 12-month period (only if an engine made in over 1000 units is used from a land vehicle).

Notes

References 
 Adam Wilkins. Shed Seven. Complete Kit Car magazine, May 2010.

External links 
  Build Your Own Sports Car: On a Budget on Amazon.com
 Haynes Roadster Forums
 Roadster Builders Forum

Lotus Seven replicas